Gary Peters (born 1958) is a U.S. Senator for Michigan.

Gary Peters may also refer to:

Gary Peters (baseball) (1937–2023), American Major League Baseball pitcher
Gary Peters (footballer) (born 1954), English footballer and manager

See also
Garry Peters, Canadian ice hockey player
Garry Peters (footballer) (born 1945), Australian rules footballer
Garry Peters (gridiron football) (born 1991), Canadian football player